Ichtratzheim is a commune in the Bas-Rhin department in Grand Est in north-eastern France.

Geography
To the east the village is flanked by woodland. On the western side run departmental road RD1083 and the railway line connecting Strasbourg and Sélestat.

Agriculture is an important element in the local economy.

Population

See also
 Communes of the Bas-Rhin department

References

External links

 Ichtratzheim Website

Communes of Bas-Rhin
Bas-Rhin communes articles needing translation from French Wikipedia